Loomis Mountain is a mountain located in the Catskill Mountains of New York northwest of Walton. Walton Mountain is located south, Pines Brook Ridge is located southeast, and Gallop Hill is located north-northwest of Loomis Mountain.

References

Mountains of Delaware County, New York
Mountains of New York (state)